Timothy John Whetstone (born 5 March 1960) is an Australian politician representing the seat of Chaffey in the South Australian House of Assembly for the South Australian Division of the Liberal Party of Australia since the 2010 election. Whetstone served as the Minister for Primary Industries and Regional Development in the Marshall Ministry from 22 March 2018. He resigned from cabinet on 26 July 2020 after a scandal over parliamentary allowances.

Background and early career
Whetstone was born in the state's South East at Keith before completing his schooling in Adelaide. He finished a tool maker apprenticeship at General Motors Holden and then went on to develop his own business building and restoring muscle cars and boats.

Whestone was a project manager on the Moomba gas fields before moving to the Riverland in 1989 to purchase a citrus property and develop a vineyard on the River Murray.

Political career
Whetstone contested the seat of Chaffey at the 2010 election for the Liberal Party, receiving a 20-point two-candidate swing from incumbent SA Nationals MP Karlene Maywald, to finish with 53.8 percent of the two-candidate vote. The SA Nationals did not contest the 2014 election, which saw Whetstone win 75.1 percent of the two-party vote.

Between June 2014 until the state election, Whetstone was the Shadow Minister for Trade and Investment, as well as being the Shadow Minister for Recreation, Sport and Racing from 2014 to 2017.

Following the 2018 election, Whetstone was appointed as Minister for Primary Industries and Regional Development.

In July 2020, Whetstone admitted to wrongly claiming travel expenses on 90 occasions, including several claims for accommodation in Adelaide at the same time as he was undertaking international or interstate travel, in what Premier Steven Marshall described as "extraordinarily disappointing" behaviour. As a result, Whetstone resigned from the Marshall Ministry on 26 July 2020.

On 6 January 2023, Whetstone stood down from his role as the Shadow Minister for Road Safety when Whetstone lost his licence after accumulating too many demerit points due to unspecified traffic offences.

References

External links

Primary Industries and Regions SA
 

Members of the South Australian House of Assembly
1960 births
Living people
Liberal Party of Australia members of the Parliament of South Australia
21st-century Australian politicians